Tornado was the name of two open-wheel race cars, raced by Ted Gray, and used to compete in Formula Libre races, between 1956 and 1958. The original car was powered by a Ford flathead V8 engine, and the second version was powered by a Corvette-derived small-block engine.

References

Open wheel racing cars
Racing cars
Cars introduced in 1956
1950s cars
Cars of Australia